The Boeing Vertol YUH-61 (company designation Model 179) was a twin turbine-engined, medium-lift, military assault/utility helicopter. The YUH-61 was the runner-up in the United States Army Utility Tactical Transport Aircraft System (UTTAS) competition in the early 1970s to replace the Bell UH-1 Iroquois helicopter. At the end of the flyoff program, Sikorsky Aircraft was awarded a contract to develop and build its UH-60A entry.

Development
Under a contract awarded in August 1972, Boeing Vertol designed and delivered three prototypes to compete UTTAS program. When Boeing Vertol failed to win the Army competition, it pinned its hope on winning civil orders and the US Navy's LAMPS III program. In the end, a variant of the Sikorsky design, the SH-60B, won the Navy contract, and the civil orders received were canceled.

Three aircraft were built and a further two were cancelled and not completed. An attack helicopter design, using the YUH-61's dynamic system (engines, rotor systems and gearboxes), was proposed for the Advanced Attack Helicopter (AAH) competition, but did not make the downselect that resulted in the Bell YAH-63 and Hughes YAH-64 being built. The Boeing Vertol AAH design was unique in that the crew were seated in a laterally staggered tandem configuration.

Design
The YUH-61 was designed to meet the UTTAS requirements for improved reliability, survivability and lower life-cycle costs, resulting in features such as dual-engines with improved hot and high altitude performance, and a modular design (reduced maintenance footprint); run-dry gearboxes; ballistically tolerant, redundant subsystems (hydraulic, electrical and flight controls); crashworthy crew (armored) and troop seats; dual-stage oleo main landing gear; ballistically tolerant, crashworthy main structure; quieter, more robust main and tail rotor systems; and a ballistically tolerant, crashworthy fuel system.

Transport aboard the C-130 limited the UTTAS cabin height and length. This also resulted in the main rotor being mounted very close to the cabin roof.

While Sikorsky chose a fully articulated rotor head with elastomeric bearings, Boeing Vertol chose a rigid main rotor design, based upon technology supplied by MBB, which was partnered with Boeing Vertol at the time. Boeing Vertol also selected to use a tricycle landing gear and a pusher tail rotor, as opposed to the tail wheel configuration and canted tractor tail rotor that Sikorsky chose, meaning that the thrust produced by the tail rotor was directed away from the vertical stabilizer, while the Sikorsky's flowed around it.

Variants
Model 237: naval version of the YUH-61 for the USN's LAMPS II competition (ship-based multi-purpose helicopter) and lost out to Sikorsky SH-60 Seahawk; no models built
Model 179: civilian 14–20 passenger utility helicopter later canceled; 1 model built

Surviving aircraft
Two of the three aircraft (73-21656 and 73-21658) built are preserved at the United States Army Aviation Museum in Fort Rucker, Alabama.

Specifications (YUH-61A)

See also

References

Bibliography

Leoni, Ray D. Black Hawk, The Story of a World Class Helicopter. American Institute of Aeronautics and Astronautics, 2007. .

External links

UTTAS program—YUH-61 origins

H-061
Boeing YUH-61
Boeing H-61
1970s United States helicopters
Aircraft first flown in 1974